Cyril John Velleman (born ) is a South African rugby union player for the Eastern Province Elephants in the Currie Cup. His regular position is flanker.

Career

Youth (2011–13)

Velleman was the captain for his school Grey High School at various youth levels, including the first team in 2012 and 2013. He also represented Eastern Province as various youth levels; he captained their Under-16 side at the 2011 Grant Khomo Week and played for their Under-18 side at the 2012 and 2013 Craven Week tournaments, also captaining Eastern Province at the latter tournament held in Polokwane.

Eastern Province Kings / NMMU Madibaz (2014–15)

Velleman was included in the  squad for the 2014 Vodacom Cup and made his first class debut on 15 March 2014 (a few days short of his 19th birthday) in their 60–6 victory over rivals  in Grahamstown.

In the second half of 2014, he captained the  team in the Under-19 Provincial Championship, his side's first season in Group A of the competition after they won promotion from Group B at the end of 2013. He was promoted to the  side for their final two matches of the 2014 Under-21 Provincial Championship; with the Under-21 team already having finished top of Group B by winning all seven of their matches during the regular season, Velleman joined them for the semi-final match against . Velleman scored two tries in their subsequent promotion play-off match against Eastern Cape rivals , helping them to a 64–9 victory and a place in Group A of the competition in 2015.

In March 2015, Velleman was named in an extended South Africa Under-20 training group as part of their preparation for the 2015 World Rugby Under 20 Championship. He featured for them in a friendly match against a Varsity Cup Dream Team in April 2015. He was included in the S.A. Under-20 squad that toured Argentina in May 2015 and started their first match, a 25–22 victory over Argentina. He didn't feature in the second match and also missed out on the final squad for the 2015 World Rugby Under 20 Championship.

Velleman was the vice-captain of the  side in their first season in Group A of the Under-21 Provincial Championship following promotion from Group B in 2014. The team struggled throughout the competition, winning just one of their twelve matches to finish bottom of the log.

Southern Kings (2016–)

In December 2015, Velleman was one of the first twenty players that signed contracts to play for the Southern Kings in the 2016 Super Rugby season.

References

1995 births
Living people
People from Somerset East
White South African people
South African rugby union players
Rugby union flankers
Eastern Province Elephants players
Alumni of Grey High School
Southern Kings players
Griquas (rugby union) players
Rugby union players from the Eastern Cape